Robert F. Greenhill (born 1936) is an American businessman widely credited with helping create and pioneer the modern mergers and acquisitions advisory business on Wall Street. He is the founder and chairman of Greenhill & Co., an investment bank headquartered in New York City.

Biography

Early life
Greenhill was born in 1936 in Minneapolis, Minnesota. He graduated from Yale University in 1958, and he received an M.B.A. from the Harvard Business School in 1962, where he was a Baker Scholar.

Career
He joined Morgan Stanley in 1962 and became a partner in 1970. In 1972, he created and directed its mergers and acquisitions department, the first of its kind on Wall Street, during which time he was credited with pioneering the modern investment banking analyst program. In the 1980s, he sat on its management committee. From January 1989 to January 1999, he served as its vice chairman, and from January 1991 to June 1993, as its president. From 1993 to 1996, he served as chairman and chief executive officer of Smith Barney. He also served on the board of directors of The Travelers Companies during that time.

In 1996, he founded Greenhill & Co. He served as its chief executive officer from its creation in 1996 to 2007. It was incorporated in 2004.

He sits on the board of trustees of the American Enterprise Institute, and on the international advisory board of the British-American Chamber of Commerce.

Personal life
He is married to Gayle Greenhill. She is the former chair of the Board of Trustees of the International Center of Photography. Harvard Business School named Greenhill House in their honor, and their three children and their spouses are all graduates of the school.

References

1936 births
Living people
Businesspeople from Minneapolis
Businesspeople from New York City
Yale University alumni
Harvard Business School alumni
Morgan Stanley people
American Enterprise Institute
American company founders
20th-century American businesspeople
21st-century American businesspeople
American chief executives of financial services companies